Estouteville is a historic home located near Powell Corner, Albemarle County, Virginia. The main house was begun in 1827, and consists of a two-story, seven-bay central block, 68 feet by 43 feet, with two 35 feet by 26 feet, three-bay, single-story wings.  It is constructed of brick and is in the Roman Revival style.  A Tuscan cornice embellishes the low hipped roofs of all three sections, each of which is surmounted by tall interior end chimneys.  The interior plan is dominated by the large Great Hall, a 23-by-35-foot richly decorated room.  Also on the property are a contributing kitchen / wash house; a square frame dairy (now a chicken house); a square, brick smokehouse, probably built in the mid-19th century, also covered with a pyramidal roof; and a frame slave quarters.

It was added to the National Register of Historic Places in 1978.

References

External links
Photographs of Estouteville in the Library of Congress, Carnegie Survey of the Architecture of the South, 1932

Houses on the National Register of Historic Places in Virginia
Houses completed in 1827
Houses in Albemarle County, Virginia
National Register of Historic Places in Albemarle County, Virginia
1827 establishments in Virginia
Slave cabins and quarters in the United States